Wazir Akbar Khan is a neighbourhood in northern Kabul, Afghanistan, forming part of District 10. It is named after the 19th century Afghan Emir Wazir Akbar Khan. It is one of the wealthiest parts of Kabul. Many foreign embassies were located there before the fall of Kabul to the Taliban, including the American and Canadian. The Hamid Karzai International Airport is also located nearby Wazir Akbar Khan.

It is a common place for foreign workers to live. The streets are laid out on a grid with Western, two-story houses that date back to the 1960s and 1970s. Most of Afghanistan's national government institutions are located in the area, including the Presidential Palace, the headquarters of the Resolute Support Mission and the German-Afghan Amani High School.

During the final stages of the 2021 Taliban offensive with the Taliban on the borders of the city, diplomats were evacuated from the district. A deadly car bomb explosion occurred at a mosque in the neighborhood in September 2022. Another explosion involving a magnetic bomb occurred near a mosque in the neighborhood in November 2022.

Terminology
The neighborhood is named after Emir Wazir Akbar Khan, a prominent Afghan hero during the early 1840s, a son of Emir Dost Mohammad Barakzai. Akbar is Arabic for "great" and Khan means "chief/King" in Pashto.

In popular culture
The early part of the novel The Kite Runner by Khaled Hosseini is set in this suburb.

References

Neighborhoods of Kabul